Andros Christofi (born 21 April 1969) is a retired Cypriot football goalkeeper.

References

1969 births
Living people
Cypriot footballers
Aris Limassol FC players
AC Omonia players
Association football goalkeepers
Cypriot First Division players
Cyprus international footballers